Auguste Isaac (1849-1938) was a French politician. He served as a member of the Chamber of Deputies from 1919 to 1924, representing Rhône.

Minister of Industry and Commerce between 1920 and 1921, Isaac attacked the French fashion industry for its “indecency” during an Anti-pornography Congress in Lyon in 1922.

References

1849 births
1938 deaths
People from Roubaix
Politicians from Hauts-de-France
Republican Federation politicians
Members of the 12th Chamber of Deputies of the French Third Republic